

List

References

H